The Tigres del Chinandega are a baseball team competing in the Nicaragua Professional Baseball League, Nicaragua's professional baseball league.

References

Nicaraguan Professional Baseball League